Susunia is a hill of southern West Bengal, India. It is known for its holy spring, flora and the rock faces on which many mountaineers of the region started their journey. It is also a reserve for medicinal plants. Susunia is a part of the Eastern Ghats and is situated at the north-western part of Bankura District.

Geography

Location

Area overview
The map alongside shows the Bankura Sadar subdivision of Bankura district. Physiographically, this area is part of the Bankura Uplands in the west gradually merging with the Bankura-Bishnupur Rarh Plains in the north-east. The western portions are characterised by undulating terrain with many hills and ridges. The area is having a gradual descent from the Chota Nagpur Plateau. The soil is laterite red and hard beds are covered with scrub jungle and sal wood. Gradually it gives way to just uneven rolling lands but the soil continues to be lateritic. There are coal mines in the northern part, along the Damodar River. It is a predominantly rural area with 89% of the population living in rural areas and only 11% living in the urban areas.

Note: The map alongside presents some of the notable locations in the subdivision. All places marked in the map are linked in the larger full screen map.

History
Susunia Hill is a known archeological and fossil site. Fossil remains of Asiatic lion, giraffe, hyena and other animal species have been discovered from areas around. The so claimed 'oldest' rock inscription of West Bengal is located here. There is an ancient carved monolith (Narasingha stone) standing at the point where the spring water is coming out of another stone gargoyle or curved projected spout. It is also used as a location for camping and rock-climbing.

Susunia village itself is home to stone-carving craftsmen. Susunia is an important archaeological site in Bankura district, yielding stone age tools. It is believed that there earlier was a fort built by King Chandravarman. Some 4th-century inscriptions are there, referring to a place called Pushkarana, once the capital of Chandravarman. Modern-day Pakhanna is considered to be ancient Pushkarana. The rock-edict reads that- The devotee of 'Chakkaswami' (Lord Vishnu), the King of Pushkarana, son of the King Simhavarmana, King Chandravarmana offers the revenue of the village named 'Dhoso' for the purpose of worship to his Lord Vishnu. There is a symbol of 'Wheel' or 'Chakra' near the rock-edict and towards the lower left side of the wheel, there is another line written in a script, not deciphered yet, probably the obscure 'Samkhalipi' (Conch shaped Script!), as opined by some experts.

 Susunia is a rock climbing centre. It is 10 km North-East of Chhatna. Chhatna is 13 km from Bankura town on the Bankura-Purulia road.

Culture
Two villages in the vicinity of Susunia have Dhokra craftsmen - Netkamla in the Saltora police station area and Bindhyajam in the Chhatna police station area.

References

External links

 Climbing in Susunia
 Weekend Tour to Susunia

Hills of West Bengal
Tourist attractions in Bankura district
Springs of India
Villages in Bankura district
Landforms of West Bengal